Benoît Lamy (19 September 1945 – 15 April 2008) was a Belgian film director, best known for his picture Home Sweet Home (1973).

Biography

Lamy was born in Arlon in the Belgian Province of Luxembourg and died in Braine-l'Alleud, Walloon Brabant, Belgium.

His film debut Home Sweet Home starring Claude Jade and Jacques Perrin won a Diploma award at the 8th Moscow International Film Festival. It was also nominated for a Golden Prize award and received 14 international awards from Montréal to Tehran.

Along with Gabrielle Borile, their picture Combat de fauves (1997) won a Golden Bayard award at the Namur International Festival of French-Speaking Film.

Death

On April 15, 2008, Lamy was murdered by Perceval Ceulemans, with whom he lived with in Nivelles. On July 15, 2014, Ceulemans was sentenced to  years in prison for "voluntary manslaughter".

Films
 Cartoon Circus (1972, documentary about Franco-Belgian comics, starring Cabu, François Cavanna, Professeur Choron, Jules Feiffer, GAL, Joke, Picha, Jean-Marc Reiser, Siné, Roland Topor, Willem and Georges Wolinski.)
 Home Sweet Home (1973, starring Claude Jade)
 Ham from the Ardennes (Jambon d'Ardenne) (1977, with Annie Girardot)
 Life Is Beautiful (La vie est belle) (1987 with Papa Wemba)
 Wild Games (Combat de fauve) (1997 with Richard Bohringer)

References

External links
 

1945 births
2008 deaths
People from Arlon
Belgian film directors
LGBT film directors
Georges Delerue Award winners
20th-century Belgian LGBT people
21st-century Belgian LGBT people